James Comrie (31 March 1881 – 9 August 1916), sometimes known as Jock Comrie, was a Scottish professional footballer who played in the Football League for Bradford City, Glossop and Lincoln City as a centre half.

Personal life 
Comrie's younger brother George, cousin John and nephew Malcolm were also footballers. While a part-time footballer with Lincoln City, he worked as an attendant at Bracebridge Pauper Lunatic Asylum. In 1915, during the second year of the First World War, Comrie enlisted as a private in the Northumberland Fusiliers. He died of wounds inflicted by a German trench mortar on 9 August 1916 near Méteren, France, during the Battle of the Somme. Comrie is commemorated on the Menin Gate.

Honours 
Third Lanark
 Scottish Cup: 1904–05

Career statistics

References

External links 
 James Comrie at readingfc.co.uk

1881 births
1916 deaths
Scottish footballers
Third Lanark A.C. players
Reading F.C. players
Glossop North End A.F.C. players
Bradford City A.F.C. players
Lincoln City F.C. players
Grantham Town F.C. players
Stenhousemuir F.C. players
Scottish military personnel
Royal Northumberland Fusiliers soldiers
British Army personnel of World War I
English Football League players
Southern Football League players
Scottish Football League players
British military personnel killed in the Battle of the Somme
Dunipace F.C. players
Association football central defenders
Comrie family